Exploding Head is the second album from the noise rock band A Place to Bury Strangers. It is their first release on a major label and the first album for their new label Mute Records. "In Your Heart" was released as the first single and "Keep Slipping Away" was released as a single on Monday 7 December 2009 in the UK.

Critical reception 

The album was a critical success and on Metacritic received a score of 79 out of 100, based on reviews from 16 critics.

Track listing

Japan bonus tracks

References

2009 albums
A Place to Bury Strangers albums
Mute Records albums